Mount Tityros is a hill landform in western Crete in the vicinity of the modern-day city of Chania, Greece.  In ancient times Mount Tityros was associated with the early Cretan city of Kydonia.  Residents of the ancient city of Kydonia dedicated a temple to the goddess Britomartis on Mount Tityros.

See also
Britomartis

References

Tityros
Landforms of Chania (regional unit)
Landforms of Crete